Aaron Joseph Herrera (born June 6, 1997) is an American professional soccer player who plays as a defender for CF Montréal in Major League Soccer.

College and amateur 
Herrera played three years of college soccer at the University of New Mexico between 2015 and 2017, scoring 7 goals and tallying 8 assists in 54 appearances.

Herrera also played with Premier Development League side FC Tucson in 2016 and 2017.

Professional career 
On December 15, 2017, Herrera signed as a Homegrown Player for Real Salt Lake of Major League Soccer.

On December 21, 2022, Herrera was traded to CF Montréal for $500,000 in General Allocation Money, a 2023 international roster spot, Montréal's 2023 MLS SuperDraft first-round pick and a sell-on fee.

International career
Internationally, Herrera represented the United States U20s. He was named to the final 20-player United States under-23 roster for the 2020 CONCACAF Men's Olympic Qualifying Championship in March 2021.

Personal life
Herrera was born in the United States to a Guatemalan father, Diego Herrera and American mother, Donni Herrera.

Honors
United States U20
CONCACAF Under-20 Championship: 2017

References

External links 
 
 Real Salt Lake Player Profile
 

1997 births
Living people
American soccer players
American people of Guatemalan descent
American sportspeople of North American descent
Sportspeople of Guatemalan descent
Association football defenders
FC Tucson players
Homegrown Players (MLS)
Major League Soccer players
CF Montréal players
New Mexico Lobos men's soccer players
Real Salt Lake players
Real Monarchs players
Soccer players from New Mexico
Sportspeople from Las Cruces, New Mexico
USL Championship players
United States men's youth international soccer players
USL League Two players
United States men's under-20 international soccer players
United States men's under-23 international soccer players
United States men's international soccer players